Lindsey Post is a Canadian ice hockey goaltender, currently playing for SDE Hockey in the SDHL.

Career 
Across 5 years for the University of Alberta, Post set programme records for most wins and shutouts. In her final year, she would lead the team to the 2017 USPORTS national championship, earning MVP honours.

Post was drafted 25th overall in the 2017 CWHL Draft by the Inferno. She would earn her first CWHL win against the Markham Thunder on the 4th of November 2017 and her first CWHL shutout the week after against the Toronto Furies, for which she was named CWHL Goaltender of the Week. She would be named Goaltender of the week two more times in her rookie season. The team would win the Clarkson Cup in her second year, even if she only played one game. While playing in Calgary, she lived with her relatives in the city to save money due to the low CWHL salaries.

After the collapse of the CWHL in May 2019, Post signed with SDE in Sweden. She would finish her first SDHL season with a save percentage of .942, the best in the league, as the team made the playoffs for the first time in history. She was named the 2019-20 SDHL Goaltender of the Year. She began the 2020-21 SDHL season in a similar way, posting a 53-save shutout in the first match of the season and a 42-save performance in the next game.

Career statistics

External links

References

University of Alberta alumni
Calgary Inferno players
1994 births
Living people
Ice hockey people from Quebec
Canadian women's ice hockey goaltenders
SDE Hockey players
People from Chelsea, Quebec
Alberta Pandas women's ice hockey players